Harry Kendall (born 4 October 1996) is an English international athlete. He has represented England at the Commonwealth Games.

Biography
In 2021, he won the bronze medal at the 2021 British Athletics Championships. In 2022, he won the English National Championship in Bedford after scoring a Championship record of 7843 points. 

In 2022, he was selected for the men's decathlon event at the 2022 Commonwealth Games in Birmingham.

References

1996 births
Living people
British decathletes
English decathletes
British male athletes
Commonwealth Games competitors for England
Athletes (track and field) at the 2022 Commonwealth Games